Nripati Nath Chttopadhyay (born 1907 – 27 May 1975) was a Bengali actor, known for his role in Teen Kanya (1961), Bhanu Pelo Lottery (1958) and Dui Bari (1963). He died on 27 May 1975 in India.

Early life
Nripati Chattopadhyay was born in British India at Narayanganj, Dhaka, Bangladesh. His father's name was Bhupati Chattopadhyay. His nickname was Prahu. Chatterjee completed his schooling from Narayanganj High School. His first film was Dipantar.

Filmography

References

External links 
 

Indian male film actors
Bengali male actors
1907 births
1975 deaths
Male actors in Bengali cinema
20th-century Indian male actors
People from British India